Tom Herron (14 December 1948 – 26 May 1979) was a Grand Prix motorcycle road racer from Lisburn, County Antrim in Northern Ireland. He specialised in street circuits such as the Isle of Man TT and the North West 200.

Career

The beginning

Herron's career started in 1965 when he competed in numerous events throughout Ireland, building up his experience along the way. In 1970, he won his first major race, the 350 class at the North West 200.

The 1970s

After winning the 1973 Irish 350cc championship, he moved up to the Grand Prix world championships. During these years, Herron competed as a privateer, against the factory backed riders, and it was a David vs Goliath struggle to compete. During this time, he met and eventually married Andrea, a sister of sometime Norton rider Peter Williams. They eventually had two girls, twins named Kim and Zoë.

At the close of 1976, he finished fourth in both the 250cc and 350cc world championships. Herron won the last Senior TT at the Isle of Man TT before the FIM stripped the event of its world championship status in 1976. The following year, he finished runner-up in the 350cc world championship to Yamaha factory rider Takazumi Katayama.

In 1978, Herron strengthened his position as one of the world's best riders on privateer machinery with fifth and sixth places in the 250cc and 350cc world championships respectively.

For the 1979 season, he finally got his big break, as a full works, manufacturer backed rider for the Texaco Heron Suzuki team in the 500cc world championship, alongside two-time world 500cc world champion Barry Sheene, and future Truck racer Steve Parrish.

The season started well, with a third in Venezuela and Italy, and a fourth in Austria. This left him in third place in the championship after three rounds. At the fourth round in Spain he crashed in practice and broke his right thumb, suffered third degree burns and was unable to race. He finished the season in tenth place.

Death

After the fourth round of the 500cc world championship, Herron returned home to compete in the North West 200, where, in the previous year, he won 2 races, and he set a lap record of 127.63 mph. The course record still stands due to alterations made.

The 1979 North West 200 will always be remembered as "Black Saturday"; as it claimed the lives of Scotsman Brian Hamilton, Armoy man Frank Kennedy, who died of injuries months later, and Herron himself. In the last lap of the last race, Herron had been fighting for third place along with Jeff Sayle, Steve Parrish and Greg Johnstone, when he crashed at Juniper. He died later in Coleraine hospital, leaving behind his wife and two daughters.

Tom Herron was buried at Leitrim presbyterian church, not far outside the village.

Grand Prix motorcycle racing results 
Points system from 1969 onwards:

(key) (Races in bold indicate pole position; races in italics indicate fastest lap)

References

1948 births
1979 deaths
British motorcycle racers
Motorcycle racers from Northern Ireland
500cc World Championship riders
350cc World Championship riders
250cc World Championship riders
Isle of Man TT riders
Motorcycle racers who died while racing
Sport deaths in Northern Ireland
Sportspeople from Lisburn
Place of birth missing